Helen Mamayaok Maksagak,  (April 15, 1931 – January 23, 2009) was a Canadian politician. She served as the commissioner of the Northwest Territories from January 16, 1995, until March 26, 1999, and as the first commissioner of Nunavut from April 1, 1999, until April 1, 2000. She is a notable Copper Inuk.
Born on the land near Bernard Harbour in the Canadian Western Arctic, Maksagak was raised in Tuktoyaktuk, Aklavik and the Bathurst Inlet area and eventually settled in Cambridge Bay to raise a family of six surviving children with her husband John Sr. Together they were stalwart supporters of the growing indigenous rights movement in the Canadian north. Their home was often a stopping place and site of discussions when young Inuit involved in negotiating the Nunavut Land Claims Agreement or participating in Northwest Territories political life passed through the community.

Maksagak was appointed as Deputy Commissioner of the Northwest Territories in 1992. In 1995, she was appointed as Commissioner, partially in anticipation of the pending creation of the territory of Nunavut in 1999.  She was the first woman and first Inuk to hold the office. In April 1999 she transferred with her office to the new Nunavut Territory and continued to provide stability to the new government in transition.  She served until April 2000 as the first commissioner of the newly created territory of Nunavut and then as Assistant Commissioner of Nunavut from 2005 until her death in 2009.

Helen Maksagak was appointed as a member of the Order of Canada in May, 2003.  She served as a member of the Qulliit (Nunavut) Status of Women Council and as an Elder for the Aboriginal Healing Foundation.

Maksagak died on January 23, 2009, at the age of 77.  Helen Maksagak Drive in Iqaluit is named in her memory.

References

External links 
 Library and Archives Canada

1931 births
2009 deaths
Inuit politicians
Commissioners of Nunavut
Commissioners of the Northwest Territories
Members of the Order of Canada
People from Cambridge Bay
Women in Nunavut politics
Women in Northwest Territories politics
Northwest Territories Deputy Commissioners
Canadian Inuit women
20th-century Canadian politicians
20th-century Canadian women politicians
21st-century Canadian politicians
21st-century Canadian women politicians
Inuit from the Northwest Territories
Inuit from Nunavut